The  is a bus company within the Keisei Bus (Keisei Group) that was established on 8 July 2019. Tokyo BRT's vehicles are parked at a building owned by Tokyo BRT and located in Shinonome, Kōtō. They have two bases: Okuto Office and Shinonome-Barn. Both are used in step with Keisei Bus.

Overview
The Tokyo BRT name was selected after soliciting possible names from the public between August and September 2018. The company also asked for public opinion regarding three plans related to their bus designs.

Development in the New Tokyo Waterfront district has needed to progress as a result of the closure of Tsukiji Market (with the simultaneous opening of Toyosu Market) as well as the development of the Olympics Village for the 2020 Summer Olympics. Improvements in public transportation in the Kachidoki, Harumi area were also needed as it was inconveniently located with no rail access.

Since 1st April 2023, the second operation service that connects Shimbashi Sta with Tokyo Teleport Sta, and Shimabashi Sta with Shijomae Station via Toyosu Sta respectively has started.

Routes

In 2020, the route was partially opened to traffic (at the section between Toranomon Hills and Harumi BRT Terminal) for passengers who live or work in the New Tokyo Waterfront district. An extension of the Tokyo BRT to Ginza Station and Tokyo Station (from the side of Shimbashi) and Tokyo International Cruise Terminal Station (from the side of Harumi) is under consideration.

Demonstration service 
The Tokyo BRT was planned to be rolled out in three phases: demonstration service (preliminary), demonstration service (secondary), and complete service. For demonstration service, there would be six buses during peak hours to service 450 people per hour and four buses during regular hours to service 300 people per hour.

During the preliminary stage of demonstration service, the buses would run one line:

 Toranomon Hills Station (B11) – Shimbashi Station (B01) – Kachidoki BRT (B02) – Harumi BRT Terminal (B22)

During the secondary stage of demonstration service, the buses would run three lines:

 Main Road Line: Toranomon Hills Station (B11) – Shimbashi Station (B01) – Kachidoki BRT (B02) – Shijo-mae Station (B03) – Ariake-Tennis-no-mori Station (B04) – Kokusai-Tenjijo Station (B05) – Tokyo Teleport Station (B06)
Harumi・Toyosu Line: Toranomon Hills Station (B11) – Shimbashi Station (B01) – Kachidoki BRT (B02) – Harumi Chūō (B21) – Harumi BRT Terminal (B22)
Kachidoki Line: Shimbashi (B01) – Kachidoki BRT (B02)

Complete service 
For complete service, there will be 20 buses during peak hours to service 2000 people per hour and 12 buses during regular hours to service 1200 people per hour.

During complete service, the buses will run four lines:

 Main Road Line: Toranomon Hills Station (B11) – Shimbashi Station (B01) – Kachidoki BRT (B02) – Shijo-mae Station (B03) – Ariake-Tennis-no-mori Station (B04) – Kokusai-Tenjijo Station (B05) – Tokyo Teleport Station (B06)
Harumi・Toyosu Line: Toranomon Hills Station (B11) – Shimbashi Station (B01) – Kachidoki BRT (B02) – Harumi Chūō (B21) – Harumi BRT Terminal (B22)
Kachidoki Line: Shimbashi (B01) – Kachidoki BRT (B02)
Olympics Village Line: Shimbashi Station (B01) – Kachidoki BRT (B02) – 〈Harumi Gochōme〉(B31, B32, B33: stops, facilities and new route are in consideration)

List of bus stops 
 ●：STOP｜：Non stop

Fare
Normal fare:

 Adults: 220 yen
 Children: 110 yen

IC1 diary bike-race ticket:

 Adults: 500 yen
 Children: 250 yen

IC commuter pass:

 Commuting: 9000 yen/1 month, 26000 yen/3 months, 50000 yen/6 months
 Attending school: 6300 yen/1 month, 18200 yen/3 months, 35000 yen/6 months
 Children: 3150 yen/1 month, 9100 yen/3 months, 17500 yen/6 months

Payment options
IC card (only Suica and Pasmo)

Vehicles
The Tokyo BRT uses three types of buses. These include:

 SORA (fuel cell vehicle): 5 cars
 Isuzu Erga Duo (articulated bus): 1 car
 Isuzu Erga (diesel vehicle): 3 cars

Timeline
2014
August – Decided on the basic policy and invited entries for business collaborators.
October – Narrowed the business collaborators down to two (Keisei Bus, Toei Bus)
November – Establishment of "都心と臨海副都心とを結ぶBRT協議会"
2015
April – Announcement of "都心と臨海副都心とを結ぶBRT基本計画"
September – Keisei Bus was selected
2016
April – Announcement of "都心と臨海副都心とを結ぶBRT事業計画"
23 June – Decided on "東京臨海部地域公共交通網形成計画"
2019
8 July – Establishment of Tokyo BRT company (as a kabushiki-gaisha)
2020
14 February – Decided on the start of demonstration service to be on May 24 
12 May – Announced the postponement of the demonstration service because Tokyo would prevent infection of COVID-19 from spreading.
1 October – Started demonstration service (preliminary)
2021 – Plan for starting demonstration service (secondary)
2022 – Plan for starting complete service

See also
 Bus rapid transit
Keisei Group
Keisei Bus (Parent company)
Keisei Transit Bus
Tokyo Bay City Bus
Kantō Railway
Kantetsu Green Bus (The bus company operates a service similar to Tokyo BRT)

References

External links

 Bureau of Urban Development Tokyo Metropolitan Government official website 

Bus companies of Japan
Bus transport in Tokyo
Bus rapid transit in Japan
Transport in Chiba Prefecture
Transport in Tokyo
Japanese companies established in 2019
Ichikawa, Chiba